Uroš Duvnjak (born November 19, 1986) is a Serbian professional basketball player for Kolubara of the Basketball League of Serbia. He is a 1.90 m tall combo guard.

Professional career
In his pro career, Duvnjak has played with the following clubs: Partizan, Sloga Kraljevo, Atlas Belgrade, Vojvodina Srbijagas, FMP Železnik, Radnički KG 06, PBG Poznań Basket, New Yorker Phantoms Braunschweig, Mega Vizura, PAOK Thessaloniki, Rethymno, Panionios, and AENK.

In 2015, Duvnjak signed with PAOK. On 14 November 2016, Duvnjak signed for Apollon Patras.

On 12 November 2020, he signed for Napredak Aleksinac.

National team career
Duvnjak was a member of the junior national teams of Serbia. He played at the 2004 FIBA Europe Under-18 Championship, and at the 2007 World University Games.

References

External links
Eurocup Profile
FIBA Profile
FIBA Europe Profile
Eurobasket.com Profile
Greek League Profile 
Draftexpress.com Profile
BeoExcell.net Profile

1986 births
Living people
ABA League players
Apollon Patras B.C. players
Basketball players from Belgrade
Basketball Löwen Braunschweig players
Basketball League of Serbia players
KK Beopetrol/Atlas Beograd players 
KK Kolubara players
KK Mega Basket players
KK Mladost Zemun players
KK Napredak Aleksinac players
KK Partizan players
KK Vojvodina Srbijagas players
KK Sloga players
KK Radnički KG 06 players
KK Radnički 1950 players
Nea Kifissia B.C. players
Panionios B.C. players
P.A.O.K. BC players
Point guards
Rethymno B.C. players
Serbian men's basketball players
Serbian expatriate basketball people in Germany
Serbian expatriate basketball people in Greece
Serbian expatriate basketball people in Hungary
Serbian expatriate basketball people in North Macedonia
Serbian expatriate basketball people in Poland
Serbian expatriate basketball people in Qatar
Shooting guards
Soproni KC players